Bécassine is a 2018 French comedy film directed by Bruno Podalydès. It is an adaptation of the French comic series Bécassine.

Cast
 Emeline Bayart : Bécassine
 Karin Viard : Marquise de Grand-Air
 Denis Podalydès : M. Proey-Minans
 Bruno Podalydès : Rastaquoueros
 Josiane Balasko : Mademoiselle Châtaigne
 Michel Vuillermoz : Uncle Corentin
 Maya Compagnie : Loulotte
 Jean-Noël Brouté : Hilarion
 Philippe Uchan : Cyprien
 Isabelle Candelier : Madeleine
 Vimala Pons : Marie Quillouch
 Claude Perron : Mademoiselle Bongenre

Production
Principal photography on the film began on mid-August 2017 in Perche-en-Nocé and should be lasted for 12 weeks.

See also
Bécassine (1940)

References

External links

2018 films
French comedy films
2010s French-language films
2018 comedy films
Remakes of French films
Films based on French comics
Live-action films based on comics
2010s French films